Khulna Govt. Girls College is a well known college in Khulna, Bangladesh. It has Higher Secondary School Certificate, Degree Pass course, Honors courses and also 2 years Masters courses. It's one of the oldest girls college in Khulna.

History
Khulna Govt. Girls College was established on 18 July 1940 as an Intermediate College as Rajendra Kumar Girls' College found by Roy Bahadur Mahendra Kumar Ghosh. Then in 1964, its added Degree (Pass) and Honours course.

Course
In 1961, HSC level was opened, then 1964 Degree(Pass) and Honours course also open. Master's Preliminary and Master's Final course also open in 1993. The course and subject as below:

Degree (Pass) 
 B. A. (Pass)
 B. S. S. (Pass)
 B.Sc. (Pass)

Honours
 Bangla
 English
 History
 Islamic history and culture
 Philosophy
 Political science
 Economics
 Physics
 Chemistry
 Botany
 Zoology
 Mathematics

Master's
 Bangla
 English
 History
 Philosophy
 Political science
 Economics

Faculty 
Principal: Mst. Roushan Akter

Vice Principal: Md. Mizanur Rahman

Head Clerk: S. M. Abu Hossain

See also
 List of educational institutions in Khulna

References

External links 
 

Universities and colleges in Khulna District
Educational institutions established in 1953
Colleges in Khulna District
1953 establishments in East Pakistan